Mannarasala Sree Nagaraja Temple in Haripad is a very ancient and internationally known centre of pilgrimage for the devotees of serpent gods (Nagaraja).
The famous Nagaraja temple "Mannarasala" in Haripad is nestled in a forest glade, like most snake temples. The Mannarasala Temple has over 100,000 images of snakes along the paths and among the trees, and is the largest such temple in Kerala, India.  Couples seeking fertility come to worship here, and upon the birth of their child come to hold thanksgiving ceremonies here, often bringing new snake images as offerings. A special turmeric paste which is available at the temple is credited with curative powers.

Location
The temple is located about 3 kilometers to the north-east of the bus station along NH66 at Haripad, in Alappuzha district of Kerala.

History
Though the legends related to the origin of a place cannot be deemed as its history, the story on the evolution of Mannarasala as one of the foremost places of worship of the Serpent Gods is associated with Lord Parashurama who is widely believed to be the creator of Kerala. This history of Mannarasala has been mentioned in the 'Mandara Salodyam', a Sanskrit poem written by Mannarasala M.G. Narayanan Namboothiri  of the sacred family based on the accounts and legends handed down and old scriptures and books available with the temple.

Legends

The Reclamation of Kerala
Lord Parashurama in order to release himself from the sin of killing Kshatriyas approached the holy Rishis. They suggested that he should make a gift of a land of his own to the Brahmins. Parashurama, the son of jamadagni, propitiated Varuna to get some land for himself. He threw into sea the axe which Lord Shiva had given him with his blessings. Thus he reclaimed the land from the sea and gave it as a gift to the Brahmins according to the rites. This land came to  be known as Kerala. This piece of land, however was not habitable because of the salinity of the soil and as a result people began to leave the place. Another reason for the Brahmins leaving the land was because Kerala, full of forests, was heavily infested with extremely poisonous snakes. To get protection from the snakes Snake worship was initiated. Bharghavarama was pained at this. He undertook a penance to please Lord Shiva, who advised him that the objective could be realized only if the flaming poison of the serpents was spread into the soil and that the only means of doing that was the worship of Nagaraja. Parashurama set out with his disciples in search of a deserted jungle in order to please Nagaraja. He found a suitable place near the seashore in the southern part of Kerala. Happy and satisfied with having found a proper place for the realization of his cherished dream, the great Rishi constructed a Theerthasthala for the performance of the penance.

Nagaraja makes his appearance
A pleased Nagaraja, appeared before Parashurama, willing to grant him his desire. According to the poem by Mannarasala M.G.Narayanan Namboothiri, the Nagaraja made his appearance as if :
" The unspeakable splendor of millions of moons! The bright magnificence of emeralds stuck to the hoods. Golden jewels made attractive by miraculous embroidery! Lotus feet worshiped by crowds of Gods! Brilliant beauty of form, full of youthfulness!".

Parasurama prostrated at the lotus feet of Nagaraja and prayed to realize his objective. Nagaraja granted his request with great pleasure. Ferocious serpents arrived at the spot at once to spread the flaming Kalakuda poison. Because of the percolation of poison, the land of Kerala was desalinated, to become habitable with envious greenery.
Parasurama then requested the Lord to bless the land forever with his eternal presence which was also accepted by the kindly-disposed Nagaraja.

Installation
Parashurama installed, according to Vedic rites, Nagaraja, who is Brahma, Vishnu and Siva in one in the 'Thirthasthala' (Hall of pilgrimage) filled with Mandara trees, the place now known as Mannarasala. (The installed deity here represents Anantha (Vishnuswaroopa) and Vasuki (Siva in spirit). The installations of Sarpayakshi, Nagayakshi and Nagachamundi, the Naga deities, as well as of their associates were conducted in the proper places with the proper rituals. Parashurama performed to the accompaniment of Vedic recitation and singing of Sama, Abhishekam, Alankaram, Neivedyasamarpanam, Neeranjanam, Sarpabali and other rites pleasing to the serpents and thereby made all the serpents happy.
installed Durga and other deities in different places; appointed Brahmins who were Tantric experts for performing poojas; nominated Kshathriyas, peasants and the Ashtavaidyas who were supreme among the physicians; thus he brought Kerala, filled with beautiful vegetation and to prosperity.

After giving important instructions to be followed to preserve the sanctity of the place, Parashurama proceeded to the Mahendra Mountains to continue his austerities.

Vasudeva and Sreedevi

Many generations passed by. The family fell into the grief of childlessness. Vasudeva and Sreedevi were the sad couple who had to bear that heavy load of sorrow, who resolutely worshiped Nagaraja to allay their grief.
It was about this time that unexpectedly fire broke out in the jungle around the dwelling place of Nagaraja and burnt down the jungle. The serpents were tortured by the flames, forcing them to hide in their pits with great difficulty.
Vasudeva and Sreedevi looked after the serpents, who had their hoods charred, bodies half-burnt, and fainting from time to time, falling down and crawling along. They gently fanned them with fans made of sweet-scented grass and poured ghee mixed with honey and oil on the wounds; cooled their melted bodies with sandalwood ointment; and comforted them. They put them at the foot of banyan trees. They performed purification ceremonies and consecrated the pits; and were put up in special places under the shade of deodar trees and in Chitrakudas.

The couple performed abhisheka with theertha like Panchagavya (a holy mixture of five items from the cow's milk, curd, butter, urine and dung); observed elaborate poojas according to rules with areca nut flower bunches, fragrant flowers and water, incense etc., Nivedyam with melted butter (ghee), milk, payasam with molasses, rice powder, turmeric powder, coconut juice, Kadali fruit, cow's milk, all mixed together in the proper form as Nurum Palum, equivalent to the elixir of life. They offered serpent deities with great devotion, appam, aval (beaten rice or rice wafers), tender coconut etc. They chanted vedic mantras, performed homams and all kinds of poojas to restore those crowds of serpents to full health.

The omnipresent and omnipotent Nagaraja was greatly pleased with their continuous penance and the love shown to his associates; Nagaraja made himself visible to the couple and blessed them that he would incarnate on the earth as their beloved son. He said " I shall assume the form of a serpent and stay here (in Mannarasala) permanently, as long as the sun and the moon are there, showering prosperity on your family and granting protection to all the devotees who come here …".
Thus Mandarasala, the place filled with Mandara trees, the holy spot where the serpents got shelter, where the earth was fully cooled, became Mandarasala.
The boon came true. The Brahmin lady became pregnant and gave birth to five-hooded serpent-child as well as a human child. The two brothers grew up together. Initiation ceremonies and Vedic education were carried out at the proper time in the traditional style. Nagaraja instructed the younger brother to enter into matrimony for the perpetual reservation of the holy family and he obeyed it. When the five-hooded Nagaraja realized that the objectives of his incarnation were realized, he informed the Holy Mother that henceforth he would live at this Illam by entering into Samadhi to bless the devotees. Then he suggested certain inviolable rituals and rules for offering worship and then went into the immaculate cellar and vanished.
(It is believed that even today that five-hooded Nagaraja stays in the cellar doing Tapas for the abound prosperity of his dependents. The members of the household always refer to him with great respect and devotion as "Muthassan" and "Appoppan" (Grand father). The jungle close by is the exclusive preserve for his unobstructed peregrinations (Appoppan Kavu - Grandfathers' Grove).

Offerings

Mannarasala Ayilyam
Mannarasala Ayilyam is the main Temple festival. On the day of Ayilyam asterism in the months of Kanni and Thulam (September and October), all the serpentine idols in the grove and the temple are taken in procession to the Brahmin illom, where the offerings of Nurum Palum (rice flour and milk), Kuruthi (a red liquid made of turmeric and lime) and cooked rice are made. The matriarch of Mannarasala Illom carries the idol of the Nagaraja and the procession is conducted with great pomp and rejoicing.

How to reach
Nearest bus stand:  from Haripad KSRTC bus stand

Nearest railway station: Haripad, Mavelikkara, Kayamkulam

Airport:  from Cochin International Airport,  from Thiruvananthapuram International Airport.

See also

 Temples of Kerala
 Temple festivals of Kerala

External links

 Mannarasala Vazhupadu List
 Mannarasala Temple;

Hindu temples in Alappuzha district